Si Te Pudiera Mentir (If I could lie to you) is the title of a studio album released by Spanish performer Rocío Dúrcal on 23 June 1990 by BMG Ariola. Written and produced by Mexican singer-songwriter Marco Antonio Solís, this would be the second and last album produced by Solís for the singer.

Seven singles were released from "Si Te Pudiera Mentir". Its lead single "Te Amo" peaked at number 5 on the US Billboard Hot Latin Tracks component chart. the follow-up singles "La Balanza",'"Falso" and "A Qué Me Quedo Contigo" enjoyed moderate success on the Hot Latin Tracks peaked within the top ten of the chart.

Track listing

Awards

Charts

 Billboard Singles

 Billboard Albums

Credits and personnel
Musicians
 Rocío Dúrcal – (Vocals)
 Marco Antonio Solís – (Writer, Composer)
 Pat Coil – (Keyboards)
 Luis Conde – (Percussion)
 Mike Miller – (Guitar)
 Henry Newmark – (Drums)
 Sid Page – (Strings)
 Wade Short – (Acoustic bass and Electric bass)

Production
 Directed and Performed by: Marco Antonio Solís
 Arrangers and Direction: Homero Patron
 Producer and mixing engineer: Andy Waterman
 Producer and Engineer: David Appelt
 Assistant Engineer: David Grant
 Mastering: Chris Bellman
 Makeup: Judy d'Ifray
 Stylist: Jeff Gardner
 Photography: Nicola Dill Visages
 Cover design: Stephen Lumel
 Recorded at: Ocean Way Recording Studios, Hollywood
 Label: BMG Music, Ariola (CD) (LP), RCA Records (Cassette)
 Manufactured and Distributed by: BMG Music and Ariola International

References

1990 albums
Rocío Dúrcal albums